Saint Antoine Street (officially in ), formerly known as Craig Street, is a street located in Montreal, Quebec, Canada. It runs to the south of Downtown Montreal and north of Old Montreal and Griffintown and Saint-Henri. It crosses the Quartier international de Montréal. Between Atwater Avenue and Greene Avenue, the north side of the street is in Westmount.

Saint-Antoine Street is primarily a one-way street with traffic running westbound only from Jean d'Estrées Street (exit from the eastbound Ville-Marie expressway) and eastbound only from Square Victoria. Between these two points, the traffic flows in both directions. The western terminus of Saint Antoine Street is at Saint Jacques Street in Saint-Henri. At the east the street leads onto Boulevard Ville-Marie (the street extension of the Ville-Marie expressway) and onto Notre-Dame Street near the Jacques Cartier Bridge.

History

West of Victoria Square
West of the original boundaries of Montreal (what is now Old Montreal), Saint Antoine Street was the main thoroughfare of a suburban area known as Faubourg Saint-Antoine, later Saint-Antoine Ward.

Transit
Square-Victoria–OACI Georges-Vanier and Lucien-L’Allier train station are located on the street while Lionel-Groulx, Lucien-L’Allier, Bonaventure, Gare Centrale, Place-D’Armes and Champ-de-Mars are right nearby. The 36 Monk serves most of the downtown portion of the street.

East of Victoria Square
Since 1799, the street was known as rue des Menuisiers, and the street bordered the land reserved for the city's fortifications between Saint Laurent Boulevard and Bleury Street. The road passed above an old river that was converted into a canal after the dismantlement of Montreal's fortifications.

From 1817 to August 1976, this street was named Craig Street, after Sir James Henry Craig, Governor General of British North America and Lieutenant Governor of Lower Canada from 1807 to 1811. The street was renamed in 1976 to bear the same name as its western portion (at a time when there was a tendency in Montreal to rename streets after French figures and places).

Points of interest
 Bell Centre
 Palais de justice (Montreal)
 Palais des congrès de Montréal
 Tour de la Bourse
 World Trade Centre Montreal

External links

 Vieux-Montréal website 
 Rue Saint-Antoine Ouest, Banque de noms de lieux du Québec 

Old Montreal
Streets in Montreal